The Week anniversary of Trujillo Municipality also called Trujillo Jubilee Week is a celebration held the first week of March in the Peruvian city of Trujillo. This week of celebration has as central day on March 5 of every year in commemoration to the installation of the first cabildo in the city made in 1535 by Francisco Pizarro. In this week of celebration are presented several acts and festivals in the city. In the last edition of this anniversary week took place the Trujillo Book Festival held in the traditional Plazuela El Recreo.

Events 

The celebration includes some ceremonies and events like the following:

Craft Fair.
Trujillo Book Festival.
Artistic Parade
Contest of typical dishes
Hoisting to  the flag of the city
Night of folk gala
Ballet Gala in the Municipal Theatre
Artistic and cultural Night, held in the main square.

See also
Municipality of Trujillo
Trujillo
Marinera Festival
Trujillo Spring Festival
Las Delicias beach
Huanchaco
Santiago de Huamán
Victor Larco Herrera District

References

External links
Location of Trujillo city (Wikimapia)

Media

Gallery of images
Cultural Promotion Center of Trujillo

Festivals in Trujillo, Peru